The 35th Great North Run took place on 13 September 2015 in Newcastle-upon-Tyne, England, United Kingdom with the men's and women's elite races and wheelchair races. World 5000 metres and 10,000 metres champion Mo Farah won the men's race for the second year in a row. He became the first British man to defend his title since Mike McLeod won the first two events in 1981 and 1982, and is only the third man to achieve such a feat; Kenyan Benson Masya is the only other male athlete to have defended his title. Kenyan Mary Keitany also won the women's race for a second consecutive year, the first woman to do so since Liz McColgan in 1996.

Briton David Weir won the men's wheelchair race for the sixth time after missing the race in 2014. Shelley Woods also defended her women's wheelchair title, making it her seventh.

The event was marred by the death of a runner, who was identified on 15 September as 58-year-old David Colley from Hull.

Results

Elite races
Elite Men

Elite Women

Wheelchair races
Wheelchair Men

Wheelchair Women

References

Half marathons in the United Kingdom
2015 in British sport
2015 in athletics (track and field)
September 2015 sports events in the United Kingdom